Arthur Aron (born July 2, 1945) is a professor of psychology at the State University of New York at Stony Brook. He is best known for his work on intimacy in interpersonal relationships, and development of the self-expansion model of motivation in close relationships.

In 2018, Aron featured in the Australian narrative film ‘36 Questions’.

Early life and education 
Arthur Aron received a bachelor's degree in psychology and philosophy in 1967 and a master's degree in social psychology in 1968, both from the University of California, Berkeley. He earned a PhD in social psychology from the University of Toronto in 1970.

Career
Aron's work focuses on the role, creation, and maintenance of friendship and intimacy in interpersonal relationships. He developed the self-expansion model of close relationships; it posits that one of the motivations humans have for forming close relationships is self-expansion, i.e., "expansion of the self", or personal growth and development.

Personal life
Aron is married to psychologist Elaine Aron.

His son is television writer Elijah Aron and grandsons are Elliot Aron (age 11) and Simon Aron (age 15).

References 

 
 
 
 

21st-century American psychologists
1945 births
UC Berkeley College of Letters and Science alumni
University of Toronto alumni
Stony Brook University faculty
Living people
20th-century American psychologists